Francisco Tobar Garcia (Quito, November 3, 1928 – Quito, February 1, 1997) was an Ecuadorian poet, playwright, short story writer, essayist, journalist, literary critic, diplomat and university professor.

He held a Ph.D. in Literature from the Pontifical Catholic University of Ecuador. He was a visiting professor at the National University of La Plata in Argentina, the Sorbonne in Paris, and the Complutense University of Madrid. He functioned as a diplomat for the Ecuadorian government in Spain, Haiti and Venezuela. He was also the director of the publishing division of the House of Ecuadorian Culture.

He died of lung cancer on February 1, 1997.

Works
Poetry
 Amargo (Quito: Ed. Presencia, 1951)
 Segismundo y Zalatiel (Quito: Ed. Presencia, 1952)
 Naufragio y otros poemas (Quito: Ed. Casa de la Cultura, 1962)
 Dhanu (Madrid: Oficina de Educación Iberoamericana, 1978)
 Ebrio de eternidad (Quito: Ed. Banco Central de Ecuador, 1992)

Plays
 Tres piezas de teatro (Quito: Ed. Casa de la Cultura, 1962)
 Grandes comedias (Quito: Ed. Casa de la Cultura, 1981)

Novels
 Pares o nones (Madrid: Ed. Planeta, 1979) - winner of the Marbella Prize in Spain
 La corriente era libre (Bogotá: Ed. Paulinas, 1979)
 Autobiografía admirable de mi tía Eduvigis (Quito: Ed. El Conejo, 1991) - considered Francisco Tobar Garcia's masterpiece by critics

Short stories
 Los quiteños (Quito: Ed. Central de Publicaciones, 1991)

References 

1928 births
1997 deaths
20th-century dramatists and playwrights
20th-century Ecuadorian poets
20th-century novelists
20th-century short story writers
Ecuadorian male poets
People from Quito
Pontifical Catholic University of Ecuador alumni
University of Paris alumni
Complutense University of Madrid alumni
National University of La Plata alumni
Deaths from lung cancer in Ecuador
Ecuadorian dramatists and playwrights
Ecuadorian novelists
Ecuadorian male short story writers